Human Rights Watch (HRW) is an international non-governmental organization headquartered in New York City that conducts research and advocacy on human rights. The group pressures governments, policymakers, companies, and individual human rights abusers to denounce abuse and respect human rights, and often works on behalf of refugees, children, migrants, and political prisoners.

In 1997, Human Rights Watch shared the Nobel Peace Prize as a founding member of the International Campaign to Ban Landmines. It played a leading role in the 2008 treaty banning cluster munitions.

HRW's annual expenses totaled $50.6 million in 2011, $69.2 million in 2014, and $75.5 million in 2017.

History 

Human Rights Watch was co-founded by Robert L. Bernstein, Jeri Laber, and Aryeh Neier as a private American NGO in 1978, under the name Helsinki Watch, to monitor the then-Soviet Union's compliance with the Helsinki Accords. Helsinki Watch adopted a practice of publicly "naming and shaming" abusive governments through media coverage and direct exchanges with policymakers. By shining the international spotlight on human rights violations in the Soviet Union and its European partners, Helsinki Watch says it contributed to the region's democratic transformations in the late 1980s.

Americas Watch was founded in 1981 while bloody civil wars engulfed Central America. Relying on extensive on-the-ground fact-finding, Americas Watch not only addressed perceived abuses by government forces but also applied international humanitarian law to investigate and expose war crimes by rebel groups. In addition to raising concerns in the affected countries, Americas Watch also examined the role played by foreign governments, particularly the United States government, in providing military and political support to abusive regimes.

Asia Watch (1985), Africa Watch (1988) and Middle East Watch (1989) were added to what was known as "The Watch Committees". In 1988, these committees united under one umbrella to form Human Rights Watch.

Profile 

Pursuant to the Universal Declaration of Human Rights (UDHR), Human Rights Watch opposes violations of what the UDHR considers basic human rights. This includes capital punishment and discrimination on the basis of sexual orientation. HRW advocates freedoms in connection with fundamental human rights, such as freedom of religion and freedom of the press. It seeks to achieve change by publicly pressuring governments and their policymakers to curb human rights abuses, and by convincing more powerful governments to use their influence on governments that violate human rights.

Human Rights Watch publishes research reports on violations of international human rights norms as set out by the Universal Declaration of Human Rights and what it perceives to be other internationally accepted human-rights norms. These reports are used as the basis for drawing international attention to abuses and pressuring governments and international organizations to reform. Researchers conduct fact-finding missions to investigate suspect situations, also using diplomacy, staying in touch with victims, making files about public and individuals, providing required security for them in critical situations, and generating local and international media coverage. Issues HRW raises in its reports include social and gender discrimination, torture, military use of children, political corruption, abuses in criminal justice systems, and the legalization of abortion. HRW has documented and reported various violations of the laws of war and international humanitarian law, most recently in Yemen.

Human Rights Watch also supports writers worldwide who are persecuted for their work and in need of financial assistance. The Hellman/Hammett grants are financed by the estate of the playwright Lillian Hellman in funds set up in her name and that of her longtime companion, the novelist Dashiell Hammett. In addition to providing financial assistance, the Hellman/Hammett grants help raise international awareness of activists who have been silenced for speaking out in defence of human rights.

Each year, Human Rights Watch presents the Human Rights Defenders Award to activists who demonstrate leadership and courage in defending human rights. The award winners work closely with HRW to investigate and expose human rights abuses.

Human Rights Watch was one of six international NGOs that founded the Coalition to Stop the Use of Child Soldiers in 1998. It is also the co-chair of the International Campaign to Ban Landmines, a global coalition of civil society groups that successfully lobbied to introduce the Ottawa Treaty, which prohibits the use of anti-personnel landmines.

Human Rights Watch is a founding member of the International Freedom of Expression Exchange, a global network of non-governmental organizations that monitor censorship worldwide. It also co-founded the Cluster Munition Coalition, which brought about an international convention banning the weapons. HRW employs more than 275 staff—country experts, lawyers, journalists, and academics—and operates in more than 90 countries around the world. Headquartered in New York City, it has offices in Amsterdam, Beirut, Berlin, Brussels, Chicago, Geneva, Johannesburg, London, Los Angeles, Nairobi, Seoul, Paris, San Francisco, Sydney, Tokyo, Toronto, Washington, D.C., and Zürich. HRW maintains direct access to the majority of countries it reports on. Cuba, North Korea, Sudan, Iran, Israel, Egypt, the United Arab Emirates, Uzbekistan and Venezuela are among the handful of countries that have blocked HRW staff members' access.

As of March 2022, HRW's executive director is Kenneth Roth, who has held the position since 1993. Roth conducted investigations on abuses in Poland after martial law was declared 1981. He later focused on Haiti, which had just emerged from the Duvalier dictatorship but continued to be plagued with problems. Roth's awareness of the importance of human rights began with stories his father had told about escaping Nazi Germany in 1938. He graduated from Yale Law School and Brown University.

Comparison with Amnesty International 
Human Rights Watch and Amnesty International are the only two Western-oriented non-governmental, international human rights organizations whose reports on human rights violations aim for comprehensive global coverage. The major differences lie in the groups' structure and methods for promoting change.

Amnesty International is a mass-membership organization. Mobilization of those members is the organization's central advocacy tool. Human Rights Watch's main products are its crisis-directed research and lengthy reports, whereas Amnesty International lobbies and writes detailed reports but also focuses on mass letter-writing campaigns, adopting individuals as "prisoners of conscience" and lobbying for their release. HRW openly lobbies for specific actions for other governments to take against human rights offenders, including naming specific individuals for arrest, or sanctions to be levied against certain countries, such as calling for punitive sanctions against the top leaders in Sudan who oversaw a killing campaign in Darfur. The group also called for human rights activists who had been detained in Sudan to be released.

HRW's documentations of human rights abuses often include extensive analyses of conflicts' political and historical backgrounds, some of which have been published in academic journals. AI's reports, on the other hand, tend to contain less analysis, instead focusing on specific abuses of rights.

In 2010, Jonathan Foreman wrote that HRW had "all but eclipsed" Amnesty International. According to Foreman, instead of being supported by a mass membership, as AI is, HRW depends on wealthy donors who like to see the organization's reports make headlines. For this reason, according to Foreman, it may be that organizations like HRW "concentrate too much on places that the media already cares about", especially Israel.

Financing and services 
For the financial year ending June 2008, HRW reported receiving approximately US$44 million in public donations. In 2009, HRW said it received almost 75% of its financial support from North America, 25% from Western Europe and less than 1% from the rest of the world.

According to a 2008 financial assessment, HRW reports that it does not accept any direct or indirect funding from governments and is financed through contributions from private individuals and foundations.

Financier and philanthropist George Soros of the Open Society Foundations announced in 2010 his intention to grant US$100 million to HRW over ten years to help it expand its efforts internationally: "to be more effective", he said, "I think the organization has to be seen as more international, less an American organization." He continued, "Human Rights Watch is one of the most effective organizations I support. Human rights underpin our greatest aspirations: they're at the heart of open societies." The donation, the largest in HRW's history, increased its operating staff of 300 by 120 people.

Charity Navigator gave HRW a three-star rating for 2018. Its financial rating increased from three stars in 2015 to the maximum four as of 2016. The Better Business Bureau said HRW meets its standards for charity accountability.

Notable staff

Some notable current and former staff members of Human Rights Watch:

Robert L. Bernstein, founding chair emeritus
Neil Rimer, co-chair, international board of directors
Kenneth Roth, executive director
Jan Egeland, deputy director and director of Human Rights Watch Europe
John Studzinski, vice chair; developed European arm; former director; member of executive committee; chairman of investment committee
Minky Worden, media director
Jamie Fellner, senior counsel for the United States Program
Brad Adams, Asia Director
Scott Long, Lesbian, Gay, Bisexual, and Transgender Rights Director
Sarah Leah Whitson, former Middle East and North Africa Director
Joe Stork, deputy director for Middle East and North Africa
Marc Garlasco, former staff member, resigned due to a scandal involving his Nazi memorabilia collection
Sharon Hom, member of the advisory board of Human Rights Watch/Asia
 Tae-Ung Baik, former research consultant
Nabeel Rajab, member of the Advisory Committee of Human Rights Watch's Middle East Division
Tejshree Thapa, former Senior South Asia researcher
Ben Rawlence, journalist and former researcher

Publications 
Human Rights Watch publishes reports on many different topics and compiles an annual World Report presenting an overview of the worldwide state of human rights. It has been published by Seven Stories Press since 2006; the current edition, World Report 2020, was released in January 2020, and covers events of 2019. World Report 2020, HRW's 30th annual review of human rights practices around the globe, includes reviews of human rights practices and trends in nearly 100 countries, and an introductory essay by Executive Director Kenneth Roth, "China's Global Threat to Human Rights". HRW has reported extensively on subjects such as the Rwandan genocide of 1994, the Democratic Republic of the Congo, and the excessive breadth of U.S. sex offender registries and their application to juveniles.

In the summer of 2004, the Rare Book and Manuscript Library at Columbia University in New York became the depository institution for the Human Rights Watch Archive, an active collection that documents decades of human rights investigations around the world. The archive was transferred from the Norlin Library at the University of Colorado, Boulder. It includes administrative files, public relations documents, and case and country files. With some exceptions for security considerations, the Columbia University community and the public have access to field notes, taped and transcribed interviews with alleged victims of human rights violations, video and audiotapes, and other materials documenting HRW's activities since its founding in 1978 as Helsinki Watch. Some parts of the HRW archive are not open to researchers or to the public, including the records of the meetings of the board of directors, the executive committee, and the various subcommittees, limiting historians' ability to understand the organization's internal decision-making.

Criticism 

HRW has been criticized for perceived bias by the national governments it has investigated for human rights abuses, by NGO Monitor, and by HRW's founder and former chairman, Robert L. Bernstein. Bias allegations have included undue influence by U.S. government policy, and claims that HRW is biased against Israel (and focuses undue attention on the Arab–Israeli conflict). HRW has also been criticized for poor research methodology and lax fact-checking, and ignoring the human-rights abuses of less-open regimes. HRW has routinely publicly addressed, and often denies, criticism of its reporting and findings.

In 2014, two Nobel Peace Laureates wrote a letter signed by 100 other human rights activists and scholars criticizing HRW for its revolving-door hiring practices with the U.S. government, its failure to denounce the U.S. practice of extrajudicial rendition, its endorsement of U.S. 2011 military intervention in Libya, and its silence during the 2004 Haitian coup d'état.

In 2020, HRW's board of directors discovered that HRW accepted a $470,000 donation from Saudi real estate magnate Mohamed Bin Issa Al Jaber, owner of a company HRW "had previously identified as complicit in labor rights abuse", under the condition that the donation not be used to support LGBT advocacy in the Middle East and North Africa. After The Intercept reported the donation, it was returned, and HRW issued a statement that accepting it was "deeply regrettable".

In August 2020, the Chinese government sanctioned HRW executive director Kenneth Roth—together with the heads of four other U.S.-based democracy and human rights organizations and six U.S. Republican lawmakers—for supporting the Hong Kong pro-democracy movement in the 2019–20 Hong Kong protests. The leaders of the five organizations saw the sanctioning, whose details were unspecified, as a tit-for-tat measure in response to the earlier U.S. sanctioning of 11 Hong Kong officials. The latter step had in turn been a reaction to the enactment of the Hong Kong National Security Law at the end of June. The New York Times reported in October 2021 that HRW left Hong Kong as a result of the Chinese sanctions, with the situation in Hong Kong henceforth to be monitored by HRW's China team. The decision to leave came amid a wider crackdown on civil society groups in Hong Kong.

Academic Immanuel Ness writes that HRW rarely criticizes human rights abuses by the U.S. and its allies, and almost always reaches conclusions consistent with Western foreign policy positions.

See also

References

External links 

 

 
1978 establishments in the United States
Non-profit organizations
Organizations established in 1978
Recipients of the Four Freedoms Award